Elisa Balsamo (born 27 February 1998) is an Italian road and track cyclist, who currently rides for UCI Women's World Team , and represents Italy at international competitions.

After competing at the 2015 UCI Road World Championships in the women's junior road race she became junior world champion at the 2016 UCI Road World Championships in the junior's road race. She won the gold medal at the 2016 UEC European Track Championships in the team pursuit.

Early life
Balsamo was born in Cuneo in 1998. Her father was an amateur cyclist. Before taking up cycling, she had competed in a number of skiing disciplines, as well as biathlon and swimming.

Career
Balsamo's first major win came at the 2016 UCI Road World Championships in Doha, where she won the Road Race in a bunch sprint ahead of Skylar Schneider. Her first professional win came at the Omloop van Borsele in April 2018, followed by a win at the GP Bruno Beghelli later in the year.

In 2019, Balsamo finished first in a bunch sprint at the Dwars door de Westhoek,
as well as stages at the Tour of California and the Giro delle Marche in Rosa. In 2020, Balsamo won the final stage of the Madrid Challenge, overtaking Lorena Wiebes in the final 50 metres.

Balsamo began the 2021 season with a win at the GP Oetingen. She competed for Italy at the 2020 Summer Olympics; whilst she broke the Italian record as part of the team pursuit, she finished in 8th position in the madison and outside the Top 10 in the omnium. After a period of stage racing in Spain and The Netherlands, during which she finished second in the Grand Prix d'Isbergues, she was selected as part of the Italian team for the UCI Road World Championships. After a number of attempts by the Dutch team to break away from the group, Balsamo won the bunch sprint from the remaining group of around 25 riders, ahead of Marianne Vos. Her first win as World Champion came at The Women's Tour, in which she won the final stage.

Major results

Track

2015
 1st  Scratch, UCI World Junior Championships
 1st  Team pursuit, UEC European Junior Championships
 1st  Team pursuit, National Junior Championships
2016
 1st  Team pursuit, UEC European Championships
 UCI World Junior Championships
1st  Omnium
1st  Team pursuit
 UEC European Junior Championships
1st  Omnium
1st  Team pursuit
 1st  Scratch, National Junior Championships
 1st Individual pursuit, 3 Jours d'Aigle
 2nd  Team pursuit, UCI World Cup, Glasgow
2017
 UEC European Championships
1st  Team pursuit
3rd Omnium
 UEC European Under-23 Championships
1st  Omnium
1st  Team pursuit
3rd Madison
 UCI World Cup, Pruszków
1st  Team pursuit
3rd  Individual pursuit
3rd  Madison (with Maria Giulia Confalonieri)
 6 Giorni di Torino internazionale
1st Omnium
1st Points
 Belgian International Meeting
2nd Omnium
3rd Madison (with Rachele Barbieri)
 2nd Omnium, Prilba Moravy
2018
 UEC European Under-23 Championships
1st  Team pursuit
3rd Madison
 1st  Madison, National Championships
 2nd  Team pursuit, UEC European Championships
 3rd  Team pursuit, UCI World Championships
2022
 1st  Team pursuit, UCI World Championships

Road

2015
 3rd Road race, National Junior Championships
 5th Trofeo Avis Suvereto
 6th Road race, UCI World Junior Championships
 6th Giro della Provincia di Pordenone
2016
 1st  Road race, UCI World Junior Championships
 1st  Road race, National Junior Championships
 2nd  Road race, UEC European Junior Championships
 2nd Gent–Wevelgem Juniors
 3rd Trofeo Mendelspeck
 4th Gran Premio Hotel Fiera Bolzano
 7th Trofeo Oro in Euro-Women's Bike Race-Mem. E.Coli
 8th Memorial Diego e Stefano Trovó
2017
 1st Giro Dei Due Comuni
 1st Grand Prix Crevoisier
 1st  Sprints classification, Giro della Toscana
 2nd Gran Premio Bruno Beghelli
 2nd Sparkassen Giro
 2nd Memorial F. Basso
 7th SwissEver GP Cham-Hagendorn
2018
 1st Omloop van Borsele
 1st Gran Premio Bruno Beghelli
 2nd Grand Prix de Dottignies
 5th Time trial, UEC European Under-23 Championships
2019
 1st Trofee Maarten Wynants
 1st Dwars door de Westhoek
 2nd Omloop van Borsele
2020
 1st  Road race, UEC European Under-23 Championships
 1st Stage 3 Ceratizit Challenge by La Vuelta
2021
 1st  Road race, UCI World Championships
 1st Stage 6 The Women's Tour
 3rd Scheldeprijs
 3rd Brabantse Pijl
 4th Gent–Wevelgem
 7th Trofeo Alfredo Binda
 7th Dwars door de Westhoek
 10th Road race, UEC European Championships
2022
 1st  Road race, National Championships
 1st Trofeo Alfredo Binda
 1st Classic Brugge–De Panne
 1st Gent–Wevelgem
 Giro d'Italia
1st Stages 1 & 4
 Challenge by La Vuelta 
1st Stages 1 (TTT) & 5
 1st Stage 1 Setmana Ciclista Valenciana
 1st Stage 3 Tour de Suisse
 2nd  Road race, UEC European Championships
 2nd Ronde van Drenthe
 4th Omloop Het Nieuwsblad
 4th Tre Valli Varesine 
 8th Amstel Gold Race
2023
 Setmana Ciclista Valenciana
1st Stages 1 & 2
 2nd Trofeo Alfredo Binda
 4th Ronde van Drenthe
 4th Nokere Koerse

Classics results timeline

References

External links

1998 births
Living people
Italian female cyclists
Italian track cyclists
People from Cuneo
Cyclists at the 2019 European Games
European Games medalists in cycling
European Games gold medalists for Italy
European Games bronze medalists for Italy
Cyclists of Fiamme Oro
Olympic cyclists of Italy
Cyclists at the 2020 Summer Olympics
Cyclists from Piedmont
Sportspeople from the Province of Cuneo
21st-century Italian women
UCI Track Cycling World Champions (women)